Kääntöjärvi is a minor village in Gällivare Municipality in Norrbotten County, Sweden.

Populated places in Gällivare Municipality
Lapland (Sweden)